Oxbridge Academic Programs is an organization that runs summer academic programs for high school students throughout Europe. The programs began with Oxford in 1985, followed by Paris in 1991 and Cambridge in 1994, with the Barcelona program opening in 2007.

References

External links 
 

Oxbridge